Metharmostis is a genus of moths of the family Yponomeutidae.

Species
Metharmostis asaphaula - Meyrick, 1921 

Yponomeutidae